Local elections were held in Denmark on 19 November 1985. 4773 municipal council members were elected to the 1986–1989 term of office in the 275 municipalities, as well as members of the 14 counties of Denmark.

Results of regional elections
The results of the regional elections:

County Councils

Municipal Councils

References

1985
1985 elections in Denmark
November 1985 events in Europe